National Tertiary Route 413, or just Route 413 (or ) is a National Road Route of Costa Rica, located in the Cartago province.

Description
In Cartago province the route covers Turrialba canton (La Suiza, Tres Equis districts).

References

Highways in Costa Rica